Mstislav or Mścisław (Polish) - is a very old Slavic origin given name, consists of two elements: msti - "vengeance" and slav - "glory, fame". The feminine forms are Mstislava and Mścisława.

List of people with the given name Mstislav

Royalty
Mstislav of Chernigov (d. 1036), or Mstislav the Brave, son of Vladimir the Great
Mstislav I of Kiev (d. 1125), or Mstislav the Great, last sovereign of united Kievan Rus
Mstislav II of Kiev (? - 1172)
Mstislav III of Kiev, or Mstislav Romanovich the Old
Mstislav the Eyeless (d. 1178), of Rostov and Novgorod
Mstislav Rostislavich (d. 1180), "the Brave", of Smolensk
Mstislav Mstislavich (d. 1228), or Mstislav the Bold, of Novgorod
Mstislav Danylovich (d. aft 1300), King Danylo's son

Others
Mstislav Dobuzhinsky, Russian-Lithuanian artist
Mstislav Keldysh, Soviet scientist in the field of mathematics and mechanics
Mstislav Rostropovich, Russian cellist and conductor

See also
Mieczysław
Mstsislaw

External links
 http://www.behindthename.com/name/mstislav

Slavic masculine given names
Polish masculine given names
Russian masculine given names